Nikola "Kole" Angelovski (born 14 March 1943) is a Macedonian actor. He appeared in more than fifty films since 1962.

Selected filmography

External links 

1943 births
Living people
Macedonian male film actors
Male actors from Skopje